Onechanh Thammavong (born 13 May 1953) is a Laotian politician and member of the Lao People's Revolutionary Party (LPRP). She served as the Minister of Labour and Social Welfare in the 6th Government of Laos.

She is a former president of the Lao Women's Union, succeeding Khampheng Boupha in 1988.

References

Specific

Bibliography
Books:
 

Lao People's Revolutionary Party politicians
Members of the 4th Central Committee of the Lao People's Revolutionary Party
Members of the 5th Central Committee of the Lao People's Revolutionary Party
Members of the 6th Central Committee of the Lao People's Revolutionary Party
Members of the 7th Central Committee of the Lao People's Revolutionary Party
Members of the 8th Central Committee of the Lao People's Revolutionary Party
Members of the 9th Central Committee of the Lao People's Revolutionary Party
Government ministers of Laos
Living people
1953 births
Place of birth missing (living people)
Women government ministers of Laos
20th-century Laotian women politicians
20th-century Laotian politicians